The Cork International Film Festival, also known as the Cork Film Festival, is a film festival held annually in Cork City, Ireland. It was established in 1956 as part of An Tóstal, and is one of Ireland's oldest and largest film festivals.

For the period 2007 to 2012, the festival was known (for sponsorship reasons) as the Corona Cork Film Festival.

The festival programme is a mix of big budget pictures, world cinema, independent films, documentaries and short films. While international films are also shown at the event, the festival organiser's describe it as a "showcase for Irish film production".

References

External links
 

Film festivals in Ireland
Film festivals established in 1956
1956 establishments in Ireland